Ayşe Soysal (born June 24, 1948) is a Turkish mathematician. She was the president of Boğaziçi University in Istanbul during 2004 to 2008.

Life and career
Born in 1948, she received her high school diploma in 1967 from the American College for Girls in Istanbul. She received her bachelor's degrees with high honors in Mathematics and Physics from Boğaziçi University formerly (Robert College) in 1971.

Soysal pursued further education in the United States, where she received her master's (1973) and doctoral (1976) degrees in Mathematics from the University of Michigan, Ann Arbor.

She was appointed as a member of faculty in Boğaziçi University's Department of Mathematics as an assistant professor (yardımcı doçent) in 1976. In her long term of instruction, Soysal was renowned as a polite and student-friendly professor. She was appointed associate professor (docent) in 1981 and full professor (natively professor) in 1991. Since 2009, Soysal is teaching at Koç University's Department of Mathematics as an adjunct professor.

Soysal also held office as vice dean of the School of Arts and Sciences, and the chairman of the Department of Mathematics. Between 1992 and 2004, Soysal was elected dean of the School of Arts and Sciences for four consecutive terms. She also represented Boğaziçi University in the Interuniversity Council (Üniversitelerarası Kurul) and she held board membership for the Turkey branch of UNESCO.

Soysal was appointed as the president (natively rektor) of Boğaziçi University in 2004, and was the first woman who occupied the office. She served as president until August 2008. She retired from her position as professor at Boğaziçi University end 2014.

Later, she continued her academic career as part-time professor at Istanbul Şehir University.

References

External links
 Ayşe Soysal's Homepage at Boğaziçi University 

20th-century Turkish mathematicians
Living people
1948 births
Boğaziçi University alumni
Academic staff of Boğaziçi University
Alumni of Arnavutköy American High School for Girls
Rectors of Boğaziçi University
University of Michigan alumni
Turkish women academics
Women mathematicians
Women heads of universities and colleges
Academic staff of Istanbul Şehir University